Ravana politissima is a species of air-breathing land slug, a terrestrial pulmonate gastropod mollusk in the family Ariophantidae. It is a monotypic genus, which is endemic to island of Sri Lanka. They are considered as endangered due to habitat destruction.

The generic name is due to early Sri Lanka king Ravan.

References

External links 

Ariophantidae
Gastropods described in 1854